Que seas vos is the eighth studio album by Argentine singer Jorge Cafrune. It was released in 1964.

Track listing

 "Orejano"  
 "El herrero"  
 "Milonga del solitario" (CBS)   
 "Ashpa sumaj"   
 "Baguala de Amaicha"  
 "Zamba del retorno"   
 "Que seas vos"   
 "Noche y camino"

1964 albums
Jorge Cafrune albums
Spanish-language albums